Mohammed Oladimeji Lawal (born 24 July 1971) is a former Nigerian footballer who played as a midfielder for clubs in Nigeria, Spain and Belgium. He is a FIFA-licensed players' agent.

Club career
Lawal moved started his footballing career with Femo Scorpion Football club of Eruwa alongside the likes of Mutiu Adepoju and moved to Spain at age 18 and signed with Real Madrid, and would spend two seasons with the B team, one in the Segunda División and one in Segunda División B. He was never promoted to the main squad, and returned to Nigeria to play for Shooting Stars F.C.

In 1993, Lawal joined Belgian Second Division side K.V. Kortrijk for one season. He played in the South African Premier Soccer League with Hellenic FC during 1994.

International career
Lawal played for Nigeria in the 1987 FIFA U-16 World Championship in Canada and the 1989 FIFA World Youth Championship in Saudi Arabia.

Lawal made several appearances for the senior Nigeria national football team. He scored on his debut, a 1992 African Nations Cup qualifier against Togo in 1990.

Personal
His younger brother, Abass Muyiwa, is also a footballer. A midfielder, he has had professional stints in Spain, Morocco and the United Arab Emirates.

References

External links

1971 births
Living people
Yoruba sportspeople
Sportspeople from Ogun State
Nigerian footballers
Nigeria under-20 international footballers
Nigeria international footballers
Challenger Pro League players
Real Madrid Castilla footballers
K.V. Kortrijk players
Hellenic F.C. players
Nigerian expatriate footballers
Expatriate footballers in Spain
Expatriate footballers in Belgium
Expatriate soccer players in South Africa
Association football midfielders